Zas may refer to:

People
 Leolin Zas (born 1995), South African rugby union player
 Stanislav Zas (born 1964), Ukrainian-born Belarusian general

Places
 Zas, Naxos, Greece
 Zas, Spain

Other
 zas, the ISO639 code for Albarradas Zapotec
 Žas, Lithuanian band
 ZAS Airline of Egypt